was a Japanese kabuki performer. He was a prominent member of a family of kabuki actors from the Keihanshin region.

Nakamura Utaemon was a stage name with significant cultural and historical connotations.

Life and career

Utaemon III was the natural son of Nakamura Utaemon I.  In 1782, his father presented the name Utaemon II to a favored apprentice; but the name was later retrieved (or  abandoned) in 1790. Then the name was bestowed on his son, who kept it and later passed it on to his son who became Utaemon IV.  In the conservative Kabuki world, stage names are passed from father to son in formal system which converts the kabuki stage name into a mark of accomplishment.

 Lineage of Utaemon stage names
 Nakamura Utaemon I (1714–1791) 
 Nakamura Utaemon II (1752-1798) 
 Nakamura Utaemon III (1778–1838) 
 Nakamura Utaemon IV (1798–1852) 
 Nakamura Utaemon V (1865–1940) 
 Nakamura Utaemon VI (1917–2001) 

In a long career, he acted in many kabuki plays, including the role of Seno-o no Tarō in the September 1824 production of Heike Nyōgo-ga-shima at Osaka Sumi-za.

Selected works
In a statistical overview derived from writings by and about Nakamura Utaemon VI, OCLC/WorldCat encompasses roughly  10+ works in 10+ publications in 1 language and 30+ library holdings.

 1936 —  OCLC 037048749

See also
 Shūmei

References

Bibliography
 Leiter, Samuel L. (2006).  Historical Dictionary of Japanese Traditional Theatre. Lanham, Maryland: Scarecrow Press. ;   OCLC 238637010
 __. ( 2002).  A Kabuki Reader: History and Performance. ; ;  OCLC 182632867
 Nussbaum, Louis Frédéric and Käthe Roth. (2005). Japan Encyclopedia. Cambridge: Harvard University Press. ; OCLC 48943301
 Scott, Adolphe Clarence. (1955). The Kabuki Theatre of Japan. London: Allen & Unwin.  OCLC 622644114

Further reading
 Akatsuki, Kanenari and Ashikuni Asayama. (1819).   OCLC 047907807

External links
Waseda University, Tsubouchi Memorial Theatre Museum
 Museum of Fine Arts, Boston:  Nakamura Utaemon III as Ohatsu

Kabuki actors
1778 births
1838 deaths
People from Osaka
Male actors from Osaka